Catherine Heath (17 November 1924 – 27 October 1991) was a British novelist.

Born Catherine Hirsch in Hendon, Middlesex, the daughter of Dutch immigrants, she was educated at St Hilda's College, Oxford, where she studied English under Helen Gardner.  In 1948, she married Denis Heath; they were divorced in 1980.  Also in 1948, she became an assistant lecturer in the University of Wales.

Works
Stone Walls (1973)
The Vulture (1974)
Joseph and the Goths (1975)Lady on the Burning Deck (1978)Behaving Badly'' (1984)

1924 births
1991 deaths
English women novelists
Alumni of St Hilda's College, Oxford
Academics of the University of Wales
People from Hendon
20th-century English women writers
20th-century English novelists